Above the Rim is a 1994 sports drama film.

Above the Rim or Above The Rim may also refer to:
Above the Rim (soundtrack), the soundtrack to the 1994 film 
Above the Rim (song), 1993 song by Bell Biv DeVoe
Above The Rim, a sports brand founded in 1989